Pitrilysin metallopeptidase 1 also known as presequence protease, mitochondrial (PreP) and metalloprotease 1 (MTP-1) is an enzyme that in humans is encoded by the PITRM1 gene. It is also sometimes called metalloprotease 1 (MP1).PreP facilitates proteostasis by utilizing an ~13300-A(3) catalytic chamber to degrade toxic peptides, including mitochondrial presequences and β-amyloid. Deficiency of PreP is found associated with Alzheimer’s disease. Reduced levels of PreP via RNAi mediated knockdown have been shown to lead to defective maturation of the protein Frataxin.

Structure

Gene
The PITRM1 gene is located at chromosome 10q15.2, consisting of 28 exons.

Protein
PreP is a 117 kDa M16C enzyme that is widely expressed in human tissues. PreP is composed of PreP-N (aa 33-509) and PreP-C (aa 576-1037) domains, which are connected by an extended helical hairpin (aa 510-575). Its structure demonstrates that substrate selection by size-exclusion is a conserved mechanism in M16C proteases.

Function 

PreP is an Zn2+-dependent and ATP-independent metalloprotease, it doesn’t select substrates on the basis of post-translational modifications or embedded degradation tags. Instead, it uses a negatively charged catalytic chamber to engulf substrates peptides of up to ~65 residues while excluding larger, folded proteins. It primarily localizes to the mitochondrial matrix, and cuts a range of peptides into recyclable fragments. The substrates of PreP are vital to proteostasis, as they can insert to mitochondrial membranes, disrupting electrical potential and uncoupling respiration. Thus deletion of PRTRM1 leads to a delayed growth phenotype. Notabley, PreP degrades several functionally relevant Aβ species, the aggregates of which are toxic to the neuron and play a key role in AD pathogenesis.

Clinical significance

PreP is the Aβ-degrading protease in mitochondria. Immune-depletion of PreP in brain mitochondria prevents degradation of mitochondrial Aβ, and PreP activity is found diminished in AD patients. It has been reported that the loss of PreP activity is due to methionine oxidation and this study provides a rational basis for therapeutic intervention in conditions characterized by excessive oxidation of PreP. A recent study also suggests that PreP regulates islet amyloid polypeptide in beta cells. Two siblings carrying a homozygous PITRM1 missense mutation (c.548G>A, p.Arg183Gln) were reported to be associated with an autosomal recessive, slowly progressive syndrome. Clinical features include mental retardation, spinocerebellar ataxia, cognitive decline and psychosis. A mouse model hemizygous for PITRM1 displayed progressive ataxia which was suggested to be linked to brain degenerative lesions, including accumulation of Aβ‐positive amyloid deposits. Recently, two brothers from a consanguineous family presenting with childhood-onset recessive cerebellar pathology were shown to carry a homozygous mutation in PITRM1 (c.2795C>T, p.T931M). This mutation resulted in 95% reduction in PITRM1 protein. PITRM1 knockdown was shown to lead to reduced levels of mature Frataxin protein, a protein that when deficient causes Friedreich's ataxia, and may be implicated in pathology in patients carrying PITRM1 mutations.

Interactions 

PITRM1 has been shown to interact with the following proteins: CCL22, CGB2, DDX41, DEFB104A, HDHD3, MRPL12, NDUFV2, PRDX6, PRKCSH, RARS2, RIF1, SUCLG2, TEKT3, TERF2, and VAPB.

Model organisms 

Model organisms have been used in the study of PITRM1 function. A conditional knockout mouse line called Pitrm1tm1a(KOMP)Wtsi was generated at the Wellcome Trust Sanger Institute. Male and female animals underwent a standardized phenotypic screen to determine the effects of deletion. Additional screens performed:  - In-depth immunological phenotyping

References

Further reading